Franco Herrera (born 19 September 2003) is an Argentinian footballer who plays as a goalkeeper for Newell's Old Boys and the Argentina national under-20 football team.

Early life
Herrera played more basketball than football as a youngster until he joined the academy at Newells.

Career
Herrera made his senior league debut in April 2022 for Newell's Old Boys,
keeping a clean sheet in a 1-0 win against Club Atlético Patronato. He also received praise for his performance in a 0-0 draw with Racing Club at the Estadio Marcelo Bielsa a week later.

International career
In 2019 Herrera played for the Argentina under-16 team which won a UEFA development tournament in Portugal. He was named in the Argentina under-20 squad by Javier Mascherano for the 2023 South American U-20 Championship held in Colombia in January and February 2023.

References

External links

2003 births
Living people
Argentine footballers
Association football goalkeepers
Argentine Primera División players
Argentina youth international footballers